The following is a list of state highways in the U.S. state of Louisiana designated in the 800–849 range.


Louisiana Highway 800

Louisiana Highway 800 (LA 800) ran  in a north–south direction from the intersection of two local roads to a junction with LA 163 south of Doyline.  The route is now part of LA 527.

Louisiana Highway 801

Louisiana Highway 801 (LA 801) ran  in a north–south direction from LA 166 south of Doyline to LA 163 in Doyline.

Louisiana Highway 802

Louisiana Highway 802 (LA 802) runs  in an east–west direction from US 371 south of Cullen to LA 2 northeast of Sarepta.

Louisiana Highway 803

Louisiana Highway 803 (LA 803) currently consists of one road segment with a total length of  that is located in the Webster Parish city of Springhill.  Two of the original three segments, which existed in Springhill and the adjacent town of Cullen, have been deleted from the state highway system.

LA 803-1 runs , primarily along South Main Street, from US 371 (South Arkansas Street) to LA 157 at the intersection of Main and Reynolds Streets in Springhill.
LA 803-2 ran , primarily along South Main Street and Coyle Avenue, from LA 803-1 at Vine Street in Springhill to US 371 in Cullen.  The route was deleted in 1960.
LA 803-3 ran  along East Road from LA 803-2 (Coyle Avenue) in Cullen to a local road east of the corporate limits.  It was incorporated into the route of LA 803-2 around 1957.

Louisiana Highway 804

Louisiana Highway 804 (LA 804) ran  in an east–west direction from the concurrent US 79/US 80 to a second junction with US 80 in Minden.

Louisiana Highway 805

Louisiana Highway 805 (LA 805) runs  in a north–south direction from the concurrent LA 154/LA 518 to LA 9 in Athens.

Louisiana Highway 806

Louisiana Highway 806 (LA 806) runs  in a north–south direction along Arizona Road from Robinson Lane to a junction with LA 2 east of Homer.  The route's mileposts increase from the northern end contrary to common practice.

Louisiana Highway 807

Louisiana Highway 807 (LA 807) runs  in a north–south direction from LA 2 Alt. to a point near Holly Circle in Haynesville.

Louisiana Highway 808

Louisiana Highway 808 (LA 808) runs  in a general east–west direction from LA 615 northeast of Shongaloo, Webster Parish to a second junction with LA 615 in Haynesville, Claiborne Parish.

Louisiana Highway 809

Louisiana Highway 809 (LA 809) ran  in an east–west direction along Siloam Church Road from LA 505 to the Siloam Springs Methodist Church south of Jonesboro.

Louisiana Highway 810

Louisiana Highway 810 (LA 810) runs  in an east–west direction from LA 505 east of Jonesboro to LA 34 south of Chatham.

Louisiana Highway 811

Louisiana Highway 811 (LA 811) runs  in a southeast to northwest direction from LA 4 east of Jonesboro to US 167 north of Hodge.

Louisiana Highway 812

Louisiana Highway 812 (LA 812) ran  in an east–west direction along Zion Rest Road from LA 811 to the Zion Rest Primitive Baptist Church east of Jonesboro.

Louisiana Highway 813

Louisiana Highway 813 (LA 813) currently consists of one road segment with a total length of  that is located in and near the Jackson Parish village of Hodge.  Two of the original three segments, which existed in the nearby town of Jonesboro, have been deleted from the state highway system.

LA 813-1 ran  along Old Winnfield Road from US 167 to LA 147 at Walker Road in Jonesboro.  The route became part of US 167 in 2004.
LA 813-2 ran , primarily along Country Road and 3rd Street, from Bear Creek west of Jonesboro to US 167 (Polk Avenue) in town.
LA 813-3 runs  along East Pine Street and its extension from US 167 (Main Street) in Hodge to LA 542 (Beech Springs Road) east of town. As of 2018, the portion from US 167 to the Hodge city boundary is under agreement to be removed from the state highway system and transferred to local control.

Louisiana Highway 814

Louisiana Highway 814 (LA 814) ran  in a northwest to southeast direction from LA 4 to a local road southeast of Chatham.

Louisiana Highway 815

Louisiana Highway 815 (LA 815) runs  in an east–west direction from LA 147 to LA 507 southeast of Simboro.

Louisiana Highway 816

Louisiana Highway 816 (LA 816) ran  in a northwest to southeast direction from LA 563 south of Simsboro to a local road southwest of Grambling.

Louisiana Highway 817

Louisiana Highway 817 (LA 817) currently consists of one road segment with a total length of  that is located in the Lincoln Parish village of Simsboro.  Two of the original three segments have been deleted from the state highway system.

LA 817-1 ran  along Martha Street, Braswell Lane, and Walnut Creek Road from the junction of US 80 and LA 507 to Cranford Street.  The route is now mostly part of LA 507, which was extended northward to connect with I-20.
LA 817-2 ran  along Tiger Drive and Rose Street in a loop off of US 80 around the perimeter of Simsboro High School.  The route was deleted in 2008.
LA 817-3 runs  along 2nd Street from LA 507 (Martha Street) to Tiger Drive opposite Simsboro High School.

Louisiana Highway 818

Louisiana Highway 818 (LA 818) runs  in a north–south direction from the junction of US 167 and LA 148 at Clay, Jackson Parish to LA 150 in Ruston, Lincoln Parish.

A spur described in the official route description became LA 3012.

Louisiana Highway 819

Louisiana Highway 819 (LA 819) consists of five road segments with a total length of  that are located in the Lincoln Parish village of Choudrant.

LA 819-1 runs  along Oak Street from LA 819-5 (North Depot Street) to a dead end north of US 80.
LA 819-2 runs  along Pecan Street from LA 819-3 (Green Street) to US 80.
LA 819-3 runs  along Green Street from LA 819-2 (Pecan Street) to LA 819-1 (Oak Street).
LA 819-4 runs  along Allen Street from LA 819-1 (Oak Street) to LA 145 (Elm Street).
LA 819-5 runs  along North Depot Street from LA 819-1 (Oak Street) to LA 145 (Elm Street).

Louisiana Highway 820

Louisiana Highway 820 (LA 820) runs  in a north–south direction from LA 145 in Choudrant to the concurrent LA 33/LA 822 at Cedarton.

Louisiana Highway 821

Louisiana Highway 821 (LA 821) runs  in an east–west direction from LA 33 north of Ruston to LA 145 in Sibley.

Louisiana Highway 822

Louisiana Highway 822 (LA 822) runs  in a general east–west direction from LA 146 northwest of Vienna to LA 145 in Downsville.

Louisiana Highway 823

Louisiana Highway 823 (LA 823) runs  in an east–west direction from LA 151 to the Lincoln–Union parish line northeast of Dubach.

Louisiana Highway 824

Louisiana Highway 824 (LA 824) consists of three road segments with a total length of  that are located in the Lincoln Parish town of Dubach.

LA 824-1 runs  along Main Street from LA 151 (Annie Lee Street) to LA 824-2 (Wynn Street).
LA 824-2 runs  along Wynn Street from the concurrent US 63/US 167 (McMullen Street) to LA 824-1 (Main Street).
LA 824-3 runs  along East Hico Street from the junction of US 63/US 167 (McMullin Street) and LA 151 (Hico Street) to LA 824-1 (Main Street).

Louisiana Highway 825

Louisiana Highway 825 (LA 825) ran  in a north–south direction from LA 15 in Spearsville to the Arkansas state line east of Junction City.

The route had a spur that ran from LA 15 and LA 825 eastward  to the Spearsville school.

Louisiana Highway 826

Louisiana Highway 826 (LA 826) runs  in an east–west direction from LA 33 to the junction of two local roads north of Marion.

Louisiana Highway 827

Louisiana Highway 827 (LA 827) runs  in an east–west direction from LA 143 in Marion to the junction of two local roads at Dean.

Louisiana Highway 828

Louisiana Highway 828 (LA 828) runs  in an east–west direction from the Farmerville corporate limits to a junction with LA 2 east of Farmerville.

The route formerly extended west into Farmerville to a junction with LA 33, but this mileage was transferred to local control in 2019 as part of the La DOTD's Road Transfer Program.

Louisiana Highway 829

Louisiana Highway 829 (LA 829) ran  in an east–west direction from a local road west of Humphreys to a junction with LA 142 northwest of Beekman.

Louisiana Highway 830

Louisiana Highway 830 (LA 830) consists of six road segments with a total length of  that are located in the Morehouse Parish city of Bastrop.  One of the original five routes was deleted soon after the 1955 renumbering, and two more have since been added.

LA 830-1 runs , primarily along Van Avenue and Pleasant Drive, from US 425 (North Washington Street) to LA 592 (Cave Off Road).
LA 830-2 runs  along Shelton Road from US 425 (Crossett Road) to Crestwood Drive.
LA 830-3 runs  along Cherry Ridge Road and Peach Orchard Road from US 425 (North Washington Street, Crossett Road) to the concurrent US 165/US 425/LA 2 (Mer Rouge Road).
LA 830-4 runs  along Cooper Lake Road from US 165/US 425/LA 2 (East Madison Avenue) to LA 830-3 (Cherry Ridge Road).
LA 830-5 originally ran  along Pruett Street and West Cypress Avenue from US 165/LA 2 (West Madison Avenue) to LA 139 (North Washington Street).  The route was deleted around 1957.
LA 830-5 currently runs  along Elm Street from LA 593 (Collinston Road) to US 165/US 425/LA 2 (East Madison Avenue, East Jefferson Avenue).  The route was added in 1970.
LA 830-6 runs  along McCreight Street from US 165/US 425/LA 2 (East Madison Avenue) to US 425 (Crossett Road).  The route was added in 1970.

Louisiana Highway 831

Louisiana Highway 831 (LA 831) ran  in a general east–west direction from the junction of LA 139 and LA 554 west of Collinston to LA 138 southwest of Collinston.

Louisiana Highway 832

Louisiana Highway 832 (LA 832) ran  in an east–west direction from US 165 to LA 599 south of Bonita.

Louisiana Highway 833

Louisiana Highway 833 (LA 833) runs  in a southwest to northeast direction along Jones Cutoff Road from LA 140 west of Bonita to US 165 in Jones.

Louisiana Highway 834

Louisiana Highway 834 (LA 834) runs  in an east–west direction, primarily along Hopkins Hill Road, from LA 591 west of Jones to the junction of US 165 and LA 835 in Jones.

The route initially heads due east from LA 591.  After , it begins a winding path that soon follows the north side of Bayou Bartholomew.  Near the end of its route, LA 834 crosses the bayou and turns to the southeast toward the community of Jones.  Here, the highway turns sharply to the east, immediately crossing the Union Pacific Railroad (UP) tracks at grade and intersecting US 165.  The road continues eastward across US 165 as LA 835 toward Kilbourne.  LA 834 is an undivided two-lane highway for its entire length.

Louisiana Highway 835

Louisiana Highway 835 (LA 835) runs  in an east–west direction from the junction of US 165 and LA 834 in Jones, Morehouse Parish to LA 585 southwest of Kilbourne, West Carroll Parish.

Louisiana Highway 836

Louisiana Highway 836 (LA 836) ran  in a northwest to southeast direction from US 165 north of Jones to LA 835 east of Jones.

Louisiana Highway 837

Louisiana Highway 837 (LA 837) runs  in a general southeast to northwest direction from LA 151 at Carlton to a second junction with LA 151 at Pleasant Valley.

Louisiana Highway 838

Louisiana Highway 838 (LA 838) runs  in an east–west direction along New Natchitoches Road from LA 546 northeast of Cadeville to LA 617 south of West Monroe.

The route heads northeast from LA 546 and parallels it for several miles.  It then turns east as it nears the Kansas City Southern Railway (KCS) tracks.  Near the end of its route, LA 838 intersects LA 3033 (Washington Street), after which it proceeds due east a short distance to an intersection with LA 617 (Thomas Road) just outside the corporate limits of West Monroe.  LA 838 is an undivided two-lane highway for its entire length.

Louisiana Highway 839

Louisiana Highway 839 (LA 839) ran  in a north–south direction from a local road at the Caldwell–Ouachita parish line to a junction with LA 557 at Luna.

Louisiana Highway 840

Louisiana Highway 840 (LA 840) currently consists of two road segments with a total length of  that are located in and near the adjacent Ouachita Parish cities of Monroe and West Monroe.  Four of the original six segments have been deleted from the state highway system.

LA 840-1 runs  along Smith Street from LA 3033 (Washington Street) to LA 34 (Jonesboro Road) south of West Monroe.
LA 840-2 ran  along Reagan Street, Montgomery Avenue, and Coleman Avenue from LA 34 (Jonesboro Road) to Phillips Street in West Monroe.  The route was deleted around 1957.
LA 840-3 ran  along North 7th Street from LA 34 (Natchitoches Street) to the concurrent US 80/LA 15 (Dixie Overland Highway) in West Monroe.  The route was deleted in 1962.
LA 840-4 ran  along South Grand Street from US 165 (Jackson Street) to Vernon Street in Monroe.  The route was deleted around 1957.
LA 840-5 ran  along DeSiard Street from South 26th Street to the junction of US 80 and US 165 at the intersection of Louisville Avenue, Powell Avenue, and Island Road in Monroe.  The route was deleted around 1957.
LA 840-6 runs  along North 18th Street, Forsythe Avenue, and Forsythe Bypass from the concurrent US 80/US 165 Bus. (Louisville Avenue) to mainline US 165 (Sterlington Road) in Monroe.

Louisiana Highway 841

Louisiana Highway 841 (LA 841) runs  in a north–south direction along Prairie Road from US 165 to LA 15 south of Monroe.

Louisiana Highway 842

Louisiana Highway 842 (LA 842) ran  in a north–south direction from US 165 south of Kelly to LA 506 in Kelly.

Louisiana Highway 843

Louisiana Highway 843 (LA 843) runs  in a north–south direction from LA 124 east of Olla, LaSalle Parish to LA 506 in Kelly, Caldwell Parish.  The route's mileposts increase from the northern end contrary to common practice.

The route from its intersection with US-165 to its Southern terminus at LA-124 is set to be deleted (transferred to local government) under Louisiana DOTD's "right-sizing" program.

Louisiana Highway 844

Louisiana Highway 844 (LA 844) runs  in a southwest to northeast direction from US 165 south of Clarks to a second junction with US 165 between Clarks and Grayson.

Louisiana Highway 845

Louisiana Highway 845 (LA 845) runs  in a north–south direction from LA 547 in Clarks to LA 126 west of Grayson.

Louisiana Highway 846

Louisiana Highway 846 (LA 846) runs  in a general north–south direction from a local road northwest of Mount Pleasant to the Caldwell–Ouachita parish line.

Under the Louisiana DOTD's "right-sizing" program, the first 5.566 miles of the route (from Countrywood Drive to LA-4) is set to be deleted and transferred to the local government.

Louisiana Highway 847

Louisiana Highway 847 (LA 847) runs  in an east–west direction from US 165 north of Columbia to LA 133 northwest of Hebert.

Louisiana Highway 848

Louisiana Highway 848 (LA 848) runs  in a north–south direction from a local road southeast of Hebert to a junction with LA 561 in Hebert.  The route's mileposts increase from the northern end contrary to common practice.

The entire route is set to be deleted and transferred to local control as part of the Louisiana DOTD's "right-sizing" program.

Louisiana Highway 849

Louisiana Highway 849 (LA 849) runs  in a general north–south direction from LA 506 east of Kelly to US 165 south of Columbia.

	

Under the Louisiana DOTD's "right-sizing" program, the Southern end (the first 3.181 miles) of the route is set to be deleted and transferred to local control.

See also

References

External links
Maps / GIS Data Homepage, Louisiana Department of Transportation and Development